Sir Robert Wade-Gery  (22 April 1929 – 16 February 2015) was a British diplomat who was High Commissioner to India 1982–87.

Biography
Wade-Gery was born in Oxford on 22 April 1929. His father, Theodore Wade-Gery was an ancient historian and fellow of Wadham College, Oxford and his mother was Vivian Whitfield, an archaeologist. 

Wade-Gery was educated at Winchester College and New College, Oxford, where he achieved a double first class degree. He then passed the examination to become a Fellow of All Souls 1951–58; subsequently he was a "Fifty-Pound Fellow" 1959–73 and a "Two-Year Fellow" 1987–89; he was an Honorary Fellow from 2011 until his death in 2015. 

On 16 June 1962, he married Sarah Marris and they had two children together. He died, after having a stroke, on the 16 February 2015 in Gloucestershire.

Wade-Gery was appointed CMG in the Queen's Birthday Honours of 1979, knighted KCMG in the New Year Honours of 1983 and given the additional knighthood of KCVO in November 1983.

Career
 Exempted from national service due to poor eyesight, he joined the Foreign Service in 1951 and served at Bonn, Tel Aviv and Saigon as well as posts at the Foreign Office (later the Foreign and Commonwealth Office). His Saigon posting was during the Vietnam War, including a period where the American Embassy across the road was captured by the Viet Cong and his wife and daughter had to be evacuated.. 

He was Minister at Madrid 1973–77 and at Moscow 1977–79, deputy Secretary of the Cabinet 1979–82, and High Commissioner to India 1982–87. He then left the Diplomatic Service and was a director of Barclays Capital 1987–99. He was a member and treasurer (1991–2005) of the International Institute for Strategic Studies, and was chairman of the governors of the School of Oriental and African Studies, University of London (1990–1999).

References
WADE-GERY, Sir Robert (Lucian), Who's Who 2014, A & C Black, 2014; online edn, Oxford University Press, Nov 2014
Interview with Sir Robert Wade-Gery (including biography), British Diplomatic Oral History Programme, Churchill College, Cambridge

External links
Sir Robert Wade-Gery: Diplomat who as a member of Margaret Thatcher’s war cabinet during the Falklands crisis delivered the order to sink the Belgrano (full-page obituary), The Times, London, 26 February 2015, page 57 
Obituary: Sir Robert Wade-Gery KCMG KCVO, 1929–2015, International Institute for Strategic Studies, 20 February 2015
Sir Robert Wade-Gery, diplomat - obituary, The Telegraph, London, 5 March 2015

1929 births
2015 deaths
People educated at Winchester College
Alumni of New College, Oxford
Fellows of All Souls College, Oxford
High Commissioners of the United Kingdom to India
Knights Commander of the Order of St Michael and St George
Knights Commander of the Royal Victorian Order
Barclays people
People associated with SOAS University of London